Aniruddha Oak (born 4 September 1973) was an Indian cricketer. He was a right-handed batsman and right-arm medium-pace bowler who played for Maharashtra. He was born in Pune.

Oak made his cricketing debut in the One-Day Ranji Trophy during the 1997-98 season, against Saurashtra, and took figures of 1-24 from 6 overs of bowling.

Oak's only first-class appearance came during the 2000-01 season, against Mumbai, against whom he scored 0 not out in the first innings in which he batted, and 15 runs in the second.

Oak made his final List A appearance in 2002-03, scoring just a single run.

External links
Aniruddha Oak at Cricket Archive 

1973 births
Living people
Indian cricketers
Maharashtra cricketers
Cricketers from Pune